HMS Crown was a 64-gun third-rate ship of the line of the Royal Navy, launched on 15 March 1782 at Blackwall Yard.

She was converted to serve as a prison ship in 1798, and was broken up in 1816.

Notes

References

 Lavery, Brian (2003) The Ship of the Line - Volume 1: The development of the battlefleet 1650-1850. Conway Maritime Press. .

External links
 

Ships of the line of the Royal Navy
Crown-class ships of the line
1782 ships
Ships built by the Blackwall Yard